Rear Admiral Guy Jamieson is a retired South African Navy officer, served as Deputy Chief of the South African Navy.

Military career

He joined the Navy in 1978 after completing school at Hilton College. He was promoted Captain in 2000 and assigned to the Corvette project as a Deputy Project Officer. He became the Officer Commanding of the first Corvette  in 2003. In 2009 he was appointed SSO (Senior Staff Officer) Surface Warfare.

He was appointed Chief of Fleet Staff and promoted to rear admiral (junior grade) on 1 November 2011. He took over as Deputy Chief of the Navy on 1 April 2017.

Awards and decorations

References

South African admirals
Living people
Alumni of Hilton College (South Africa)
Year of birth missing (living people)